The 1993 North Korea Census was a census conducted by the Central Bureau of Statistics on 31 December 1993.

The population of the country, according to this census, was 21,213,478. The life expectancy at birth was of 70.7 years (67.8 for males and 73.9 for females).

The census was inconsistent internally and in comparison to previous censuses. According to Nicholas Eberstadt: "Quotation marks should attend the '1993' census because that enumeration was not actually conducted in 1993, but rather in early 1994, with respondents replying to questions about their circumstances as of year-end 1993; needless to say, such a procedure is highly unorthodox."

See also
 Demographics of North Korea
 2008 North Korea Census

References

1993
Census
December 1993 events in Asia
North Korea